Cihtong Township or Citong Township is a rural township in Yunlin County, Taiwan.  It has a population total of 27,538 and an area of 50.8502 square kilometres.

Name

Geography

Administrative divisions
The township comprises 14 villages: Citong, Damei, Gancuo, Ganxi, Liuge, Mayuan, Puwei, Puzi, Raoping, Sihe, Wuhua, Xinggui, Xingtong and Yihe.

Economy
The township main economy is agriculture. It produces paddy rice mainly along the northern township border with Zhuoshui River in which the output is the highest in the county.

References

External links
"To know Cihtong " at township website
Yunlin's Cihtong Township

Townships in Yunlin County